Ezekiel Odera (born 9 March 1988) is a Kenyan footballer who currently plays as a striker for Kenyan Premier League side Nairobi City Stars.

Club career

Odera signed his first professional contract after joining Kenyan Premier League side KCB in 2010 from Buruburu-based Sports Connect Academy.

He went on to top score for the club with 11 goals and that performance ultimately earned him the 2009 New Player of the year and runners-up top scorer awards.

In 2011 he moved to Gor Mahia for a season before returning to KCB once again in 2012, and on two other occasions including on loan.

He went on to feature for four other top-tier sides including Thika United F.C., Ushuru, Sofapaka F.C., Nairobi City Stars and A.F.C. Leopards where he was named the March 2018 player of the Month.

He was part of Nairobi City Stars during their first season in the second tier in 2017, then in their promotion year in the 2019-20 season after rejoining in Jan 2020.

Playing style
Odera's greatest assets are build-up, controlling skills, one v one against defenders, prowess in aerial duels and penalty kicking skills.

References

External links
 

Living people
1988 births
Nairobi City Stars players
A.F.C. Leopards players
Gor Mahia F.C. players
Thika United F.C. players
Ushuru F.C. players
Sofapaka F.C. players
Kenya Commercial Bank S.C. players
Kenyan_footballers